Frank Bartley IV (born February 25, 1994) is an American professional basketball player for Pallacanestro Trieste of the Italia Lega Basket Serie A (LBA). He played college basketball for the BYU Cougars and the Louisiana Ragin' Cajuns.

Early life and high school
Bartley was born and grew up in Baton Rouge, Louisiana, and attended Christian Life Academy, where he played basketball and football. As a senior, he averaged 14.2 points and 6.7 rebounds and was named the District 7-1A co-MVP, All-Metro, and Class 1A All-State by the Louisiana Sports Writers Association. He was also named All-Metro in football as a wide receiver. 

After graduating Bartley enrolled at Future College Prep in Carson, California, for a postgraduate year and averaged 19.7 points, 8.0 rebounds, and 6.0 assists per game. He committed to play college basketball at BYU over offers from Auburn and Fordham.

College career
Bartley began his collegiate career at Brigham Young University. He averaged 3.9 points per game in 34 games played as a freshman and 2.5 points per game over 33 games played in his sophomore season. Bartley announced his intent to transfer at the end of the season and ultimately chose to transfer to Louisiana over offers from Hawaii, Nevada, Long Beach State, Oral Roberts, Southeastern Louisiana, Indianapolis and Louisiana Tech.

After sitting out one season due to NCAA transfer rules, Bartley entered the next season as a starter. On November 14, 2016, Bartley scored a career-high 29 points in an 84–83 loss to Montana State. He averaged 15.3 points, 4.3 rebounds, 2.6 assists, and 1.7 steals per game and was named the Sun Belt Conference Newcomer of the Year and second team All-Conference. As a redshirt senior, Bartley was named first team All-Sun Belt after averaging 17.8 points, 3.9 rebounds, 2.0 assists and 1.4 steals per game.

Professional career

Saint John Riptide
Bartley was signed by the Saint John Riptide on October 29, 2018 of the National Basketball League of Canada (NBLC). Bartley finished eighth in the league with 19.3 points per game and also averaged 5.1 rebounds, 3.2 assists and 1.3 steals and was named first team All-NBLC and the NBLC Rookie of the Year.

Valladolid
Bartley signed with CB Ciudad de Valladolid of LEB Oro, the Spanish second division, on July 31, 2019. He was named the LEB Oro Player of the Year after averaging a league high 16.3 points per game through 24 games before the season was ended prematurely due to Covid-19.

Medi Bayreuth
Bartley signed with Medi Bayreuth of the German Basketball Bundesliga (BBL) on July 8, 2020. He averaged 14.3 points, 2.7 rebounds, 2.4 assists and 1.5 steals per game.

Bakken Bears
On August 20, 2021, Bartley signed with the Bakken Bears of the Basketligaen.

Ironi Ness Ziona B.C.
On September 20, 2021, Bartley signed with Ironi Ness Ziona B.C. of the Israeli Basketball Premier League.

Pallacanestro Trieste
On July 23, 2022, he has signed with Pallacanestro Trieste of the Italia Lega Basket Serie A (LBA).

References

External links
Louisiana Ragin' Cajuns bio
BYU Cougars bio 
RealGM profile

1994 births
Living people
American men's basketball players
American expatriate basketball people in Canada
American expatriate basketball people in Denmark
American expatriate basketball people in Germany
American expatriate basketball people in Spain
Bakken Bears players
Basketball players from Baton Rouge, Louisiana
BYU Cougars men's basketball players
Ironi Nes Ziona B.C. players
Louisiana Ragin' Cajuns men's basketball players
Pallacanestro Trieste players
Point guards
Saint John Riptide players